Milan Čermák (born 24 December 1949, in Czechoslovakia) is a retired footballer who played as a forward.

External links

 

1949 births
Living people
Czechoslovak footballers
Association football forwards
AC Sparta Prague players
FC Baník Ostrava players
Bohemians 1905 players
SK Kladno players
FK Teplice players
Czechoslovakia international footballers